Janez Zakotnik (born 2 June 1950) is a former Yugoslav cyclist. He competed in the individual road race and team time trial events at the 1972 Summer Olympics.

References

External links
 

1950 births
Living people
Yugoslav male cyclists
Olympic cyclists of Yugoslavia
Cyclists at the 1972 Summer Olympics
Sportspeople from Ljubljana
Slovenian male cyclists